Kim Young-ae (21 April 1951 – 9 April 2017) was a South Korean actress.

Career
Kim Young-ae began her acting career when she joined MBC's 3rd Open Recruitment  in 1971. She made her acting debut in the TV police procedural Chief Inspector and subsequently built a prolific career in film and television.

After she made her film debut in 1973's Long Live the Island Frogs, Kim became most active on the big screen in the 1970s and early 1980s, appearing in films such as Wang Sib Ri, My Hometown (also known as Wangsimni or A Bygone Romance, 1976), Suddenly at Midnight (1981), and Diary of King Yeonsan (1987).

As she grew older, Kim transitioned to more television work. Among her notable television dramas are Queen Min (1973), Ilchul (or Sunrise, 1989), Magpie-in-law (1991), The Brothers' River (1996), Waves (1999), Go, Mom, Go! (2003), Hwang Jini (2006), Royal Family (2011), and Moon Embracing the Sun (2012).

In 2009, she drew praise for her portrayal of a terminally ill yet headstrong mother who has a love-hate relationship with her daughter in the dramedy film Aeja (internationally known as Goodbye Mom). Another notable role was as a Busan restaurant owner whose son is arrested and tortured during the 1980s in The Attorney (2013). Kim later won Best Supporting Actress at the Grand Bell Awards and the Blue Dragon Film Awards for her performances.

Other activities
In 2006, Kim temporarily put her acting career on hold when she became the vice chairman of cosmetics firm Chamtowon, which mainly produces soap and mud packs. Her company filed a  lawsuit against state-owned network KBS in 2008, after the program Consumer Report falsely reported that Chamtowon's mud-based products contained heavy metals above safe levels. During the eight months after the broadcast, the company went virtually bankrupt, and had to suspend operations at its factory in Jeongeup in North Jeolla Province and lay off 100 workers. After the Korea Food and Drug Administration confirmed that the magnetic substance found in the mud products was oxidized steel originally present in the mud, not foreign materials put in the products during the manufacturing process, the court ruled in favor of Chamtowon, and ordered KBS to release a correction regarding the wrong report. But Chamtowon wasn't able to recover from its financial losses, and the strain contributed to Kim's divorce from her husband.

Death
Kim died of pancreatic cancer on April 9, 2017, just two weeks before her 66th birthday.

Filmography

Film

Television series

Radio program
This Is Hwang In-yong and Kim Young-ae (KBS, 1992)

Awards
2017 KBS Drama Awards: Special Achievement Award
2017 54th Grand Bell Awards: Special Award
2017 53rd Baeksang Arts Awards: Lifetime Achievement Award
2015 8th Korea Drama Awards: Lifetime Achievement Award
2014 35th Blue Dragon Film Awards: Best Supporting Actress (The Attorney)
2014 51st Grand Bell Awards: Best Supporting Actress (The Attorney)
2014 23rd Buil Film Awards: Best Supporting Actress (The Attorney)
2014 9th Max Movie Awards: Best Supporting Actress (The Attorney)
2011 MBC Drama Awards: Special Award (Royal Family) 
2010 7th Max Movie Awards: Best Supporting Actress (Goodbye Mom) 
2009 46th Grand Bell Awards: Best Supporting Actress (Goodbye Mom)
2000 SBS Drama Awards: Top Excellence Award, Actress (Waves)
2000 SBS Drama Awards: Big Star Award (Cheers for the Women)
2000 27th Korea Broadcasting Awards: Best TV Actress  (Waves)
2000 36th Baeksang Arts Awards: Best TV Actress (Waves)
1997 KBS Drama Awards: Top Excellence Award, Actress (Colors, Reporting for Duty, Until We Can Love)
1997 33rd Baeksang Arts Awards: Best TV Actress (The Brothers' River)
1990 KBS Drama Awards: Top Excellence Award, Actress (Ilchul)
1982 18th Baeksang Arts Awards: Best TV Actress (Nocturne)
1974 MBC Talent Awards: Excellence Award, Actress
1974 10th Baeksang Arts Awards: Best New TV Actress (Queen Min)

References

External links
 

1951 births
2017 deaths
South Korean film actresses
South Korean television actresses
Deaths from pancreatic cancer
Deaths from cancer in South Korea
Gwangsan Kim clan
Best Actress Paeksang Arts Award (television) winners
Best New Actress Paeksang Arts Award (television) winners